The 2011 Amber Valley Borough Council election took place on 5 May 2011 to elect members of Amber Valley Borough Council in Derbyshire, England. One third of the council was up for election and the Conservative Party stayed in overall control of the council.

After the election, the composition of the council was:
Conservative 28
Labour 15
British National Party 2

Campaign
15 seats were contested in the election, mainly from Conservative leaning areas of the council. 1 seat was sure to remain in Conservative hands in South West Parishes after only a Conservative candidate stood for the seat.

The Conservatives pointed to their record in control of the council, Labour pledged to reduce car parking charges, while the Liberal Democrats focused on plans to regenerate Heanor. The parties also disagreed over how to make cuts as a result of a reduction in central government funding, such as over plans to close local offices of the council and to sell the main council headquarters.

Election result
The results saw the Conservative majority remain strong after losing only 1 seat to Labour, leaving the Conservatives with 28 seats compared to 15 for Labour. Labour gained the seat in Heage and Ambergate from the Conservatives, while the closest result came in Ripley where the Conservative held on by 14 votes. Both the Conservative and Labour parties said they were pleased with the results, while neither the Liberal Democrats or the British National Party won any seats. Overall turnout in the election was 45.83%, almost 12% up on when these seats were last contested in 2007.

Ward results

References

2011 English local elections
2011
2010s in Derbyshire